Sunetra Sarker (born 25 June 1973) is an English actress and presenter, known for her roles as Nisha Batra in Brookside, Anji Mittel in No Angels, Zoe Hanna in Casualty and Kaneez Paracha in Ackley Bridge. In 2014, she took part in the twelfth series of Strictly Come Dancing, partnered with Brendan Cole. Since 2019, she is a regular participant on Celebrity Gogglebox partnering with Georgia Taylor and became a panellist on the lunch time chat show Loose Women in 2021.

Early life
Sarker was born in Liverpool into an Indian family. Her father is a retired doctor, and her mother Bisakha taught Indian classical dance, for which she was awarded an MBE in December 2013. Sarker has a degree in Information Systems for Business in Europe from  Brunel University London. Her great-grandfather was the lawyer, novelist and political activist Nares Sen-Gupta. She is of Bengali origin.

Career
Sarker has played a wide variety of roles in her career. Her initial success came when she was cast as recurring character Nisha Batra in the Channel 4 soap opera Brookside from 1988 to 1991, before returning as a regular from 2000 until 2003. Sarker also starred in the regional soap  opera London Bridge. This was followed by her portrayal of Anji Mittel in No Angels from 2004 to 2006.

Sarker's next notable role was portraying the part of Clare Burns in the BBC drama The Chase, until the show was pulled after its second series. In 2007, Sarker was a contestant on the celebrity cooking series Celebrity MasterChef. Subsequently, Sarker played the role of Dr Zoe Hanna in the BBC medical drama Casualty from December 2007 until May 2016. After her departure was announced, Sarker made a promise to co-star Jamie Davis that she would return for one episode when he decided to leave the programme, a promise she honoured in 2018, appearing in an episode broadcast on 13 January.

In 2017, she played DCI Jane Burr in the second series of ITV's Safe House. Since 2017, Sarker has starred in the Channel 4 drama series Ackley Bridge as Kaneez Paracha, for which she received the award for Best TV Character at the Asian Media Awards.

On 23 July 2021, it was confirmed that Sarker would become a panellist on Loose Women.

Strictly Come Dancing

In autumn 2014, Sarker competed in the twelfth series of the BBC's Strictly Come Dancing, partnered with New Zealand professional dancer Brendan Cole. In the first week, the couple danced a Tango to "Bad Case of Loving You (Doctor, Doctor)" by Robert Palmer and scored 24. In the second week they danced a Cha-cha-cha to "Million Dollar Bill" by Whitney Houston and scored 26. In the third week the couple danced the American Smooth to "The Way You Look Tonight" from the film Swing Time and scored 40, including a 9 from head judge Len Goodman. Because of Sunetra's filming schedule, the routine had to be learned in a single day.

In the fourth week the couple danced the Salsa to "Turn the Beat Around" by Vicki Sue Robinson and scored 27. In the fifth week the couple danced the Viennese Waltz to "Anyone Who Had a Heart" by Cilla Black and scored 30. In week six, opening the show, they danced a Jive to "Tainted Love" by Gloria Jones and scored 27. In week seven they danced a Foxtrot to "All of Me" by John Legend and scored 31. In week eight, at Blackpool, they danced a Samba to "I Don't Feel Like Dancin'" by the Scissor Sisters and scored 30. The couple were voted into the dance-off against Judy Murray and Anton du Beke, but were unanimously saved by the judges. In week nine they danced a Waltz, to "Last Request" by Paolo Nutini, and again scored 30, placing them in one from last place. The couple was voted into the dance-off with Steve Backshall and Ola Jordan, but were saved by three votes to one from the judges. In week ten, they danced a Rhumba to "The Girl from Ipanema" by Michael Bolton. They were again voted into the dance-off, against Mark Wright and Karen Hauer, but were unanimously voted out by the judges.

Personal life
On 23 February 2017, Sarker and her ancestors were the subject of an episode of Who Do You Think You Are? shown on BBC One in which she traced them to Bengal. She learned about her family's involvement in the struggle for independence in India and one of her ancestors' connection to Gandhi. Travelling next to Bangladesh, she visited her great-grandmother's ancestral village where she discovered the story of how her family were caught up in the Bangladeshi war of independence from Pakistan in 1971.

Sarker married Nick Corfield in 2003 and they have a son, Noah, born in 2001. Sarker and Corfield divorced in 2009. In November 2018 Sarker married Scott Carey, whom she has known since 1991.

Filmography

References

External links
 

1973 births
Living people
Actresses from Liverpool
English film actresses
English soap opera actresses
English television actresses
English people of Bengali descent
British actresses of Indian descent
Bengali Hindus
Alumni of Brunel University London